Marcelino Blanco (born 3 January 1966) is a retired Paraguayan football defender.

References

1966 births
Living people
Paraguayan footballers
Club Sol de América footballers
Club Guaraní players
S.D. Aucas footballers
Association football defenders
Paraguay international footballers
Paraguayan expatriate footballers
Expatriate footballers in Ecuador
Paraguayan expatriate sportspeople in Ecuador